Solarpark Meuro is a 166 megawatt (MW) photovoltaic power station located in Meuro and Schipkau, Germany. The plant was built on a former lignite mine and is the country's largest solar park. It was named POWER-GEN International solar project of the year in 2012.

The PV system uses about 636,000 solar panels provided by Canadian Solar and 20k-string inverters from REFUsol.
It is also the first solar park to use a 690VAC gridvoltage for some of REFUsol's 333k HV central inverters.

See also

Energy policy of the European Union
Photovoltaics
Renewable energy commercialization
Renewable energy in the European Union

References

Photovoltaic power stations in Germany
Economy of Brandenburg
2011 establishments in Germany